Open Fiber S.p.A. (formerly Enel Open Fiber S.p.A.) is an Italian wholesale only telecommunications company, owned 50% by Enel and 50% by CDP Equity (part of the CDP Group).

History 
Enel Open Fiber was established in December 2015, as a wholly owned subsidiary of Italian energy company Enel, in order to build an independent fibre-based access network.

In July 2016 the company acquired Metroweb from F2i SGR and Cassa Depositi e Prestiti, a private equity fund and a sovereign wealth fund respectively. However, CDP also acquired 50% stake in Open Fiber.

The company operates in the so-called "market success" clusters A and B as resolved by the Council of Ministers of the Italian Republic on 4 March 2015, ie 282 municipalities in large urban areas by 2022. The areas chosen for the project are a subset of the 642 municipalities categorized as clusters A and B by the Government. Open Fiber, estimating a cost corresponding to less than half of that proposed by the competition, won all fourteen lots envisaged in the three calls for the "ultra-broadband plan" launched by Infratel Italia for the construction of the network in clusters C and D ie "white areas" with low population density. The plan provides for the implementation of FTTH optical fiber with speeds up to 1 Gbit/s for urban areas and agglomerations of housing units, while preparing FWA radio links for rural or impervious areas and scattered houses.

As of February 2023, optical fiber was carried out to 128,518 customers for a declared total cost for the Italian State of 1,471,810,248 euro (11,452 euro for each person). The service is available solely in 2,463,374 immobiliar units in respect of the 6,411,150 that had been planned for June 2023. Broadband diffusion can be verified in real time through a geographical search engine and an interactive map.

References

Citations

Sources

External links

 

Enel
Italian companies established in 2015
Telecommunications companies established in 2015
Companies based in Milan
Telecommunications companies of Italy